Quercus mcvaughii is a species of oak tree native to Mexico.

Description
Quercus mcvaughii is an evergreen or drought-deciduous tree which typically reaches  in height, occasionally growing to 25 m. Smaller trees often have a shrubby appearance with a dense and rounded crown. Older trees have an irregular and open form.

Taxonomy 
The species was first discovered in 1989 in the Sierra de Ocampo within Cascada de Basaseachi National Park, and formally described in 1992. It is closely related to Q. crassifolia.

Distribution and habitat 
It is native to the northern and central Sierra Madre Occidental, ranging from northern Sonora (Bavispe Flora and Fauna Protection Area) through western Chihuahua, and western Durango to southeastern Sinaloa.

It is common in the oak and pine–oak woodlands of the central Sierra. It often occurs with Q. rugosa, Q. durifolia, Q. sideroxyla, Q. emoryi, Q. arizonica, Pinus arizonica, P. engelmannii, and P. leiophylla.

References

Flora of the Sierra Madre Occidental
Endemic oaks of Mexico
mcvaughii